Ingunn Bollerud (born 16 November 1972) is a Norwegian former cyclist. She was born in Nes municipality in Akershus. She won the Norwegian National Road Race Championship in 1996.

She competed at the 1992, 1996 and 2000 Summer Olympics.

References

External links

1972 births
Living people
People from Nes, Akershus
Norwegian female cyclists
Olympic cyclists of Norway
Cyclists at the 1992 Summer Olympics
Cyclists at the 1996 Summer Olympics
Cyclists at the 2000 Summer Olympics
Sportspeople from Viken (county)